The Worthless is a 1982 Finnish film directed by Mika Kaurismäki, who also co-wrote the film with his brother Aki Kaurismäki. It is a road movie about two men and a woman driving around the country as they are being chased by a group of criminals and the police.

Mika Kaurismäki won the Jussi Award for Best Direction for the film.

Cast 
 Matti Pellonpää as Manne
 Pirkko Hämäläinen as Veera
 Juuso Hirvikangas as Harri Salminen
 Esko Nikkari as Hagström
 Jorma Markkula as Mitja
 Asmo Hurula as Väyry
 Ari Piispa as Vasili
 Aki Kaurismäki as Ville Alfa
 Aino Seppo as Tiina
 Veikko Aaltonen as Juippi
 Elina Kivihalme as Anna-Kaarina

References

External links 
 

1980s chase films
Films directed by Mika Kaurismäki
Films set in Finland
Films shot in Finland
Finnish crime drama films